xv is a shareware program written by John Bradley to display and modify digital images under the X Window System.

While popular in the early 1990s ("XV is widely considered to be the preeminent image viewer for the X Window System"), no official releases have been made since December 1994. Bradley was unable to negotiate the LZW patent licence necessary for encoding the then-popular GIF format. The patent has now expired, so this legal constraint is no longer relevant.

Until at least 2000, Bradley collected third-party updates to xv, for example, support for the PNG image format.
These were published as source code patches only.
Additional patches are still created and maintained by volunteers.

xv can be run from either the command line or through a graphical interface.
It distinguishes itself from many other bitmap viewing and editing programs with a very efficient interface in which the user edits just the parameters of a fixed pipeline of processing steps, rather than modifying the bitmap directly in each operation. As a result, the user can easily undo operations (such as cropping, color modifications, filtering) out of order, rather than only being able to undo the respective last operation. While this concept limits what xv can do compared to some alternatives, the functionality it provides can be applied very conveniently and efficiently.

See also
 Comparison of image viewers

Notes

External links
 http://www.trilon.com/xv/ Official Website
 http://sonic.net/~roelofs/greg_xv.html Greg's Jumbo Patches for John Bradley's XV
 Devex Opus, http://groupbcl.ca/blog/posts/2019/building-xv-on-ubuntu/ Installing XV on Ubuntu 18.04 LTS (in 2019)
 https://github.com/jasper-software/xv A GitHub repository for the XV software with improvements and patches incorporated from numerous sources (e.g., Greg's Jumbo Patch Set, patches from the Fedora Linux RPM on RPM Fusion, support for CMake-based builds, GitHub Actions CI builds for Linux and MacOS, changes for JasPer 3.x JPEG-2000 support)

Image viewers
Shareware
X Window programs